Tokatee Klootchman State Natural Site is a state park in the U.S. state of Oregon. Administered by the Oregon Parks and Recreation Department, it offers wildlife, bird, and marine-mammal watching, and it has a beach.

See also
 List of Oregon state parks

References

State parks of Oregon
Protected areas of Lane County, Oregon